Fletcher Granite Company is a granite quarry that opened in 1881 in Westford, Massachusetts.

History

In 2003, the company rebuilt their rail line, which connects to Pan Am Railways. At the time, they imported rock from Georgia and transferred it at Iron Horse Park onto trucks, which then transported the stone to the quarry. In 2010, the company ceased operations due to declining revenue.
 The company was sold in 2011,

As of 2009, the company also owned a quarry in Milford, New Hampshire.

References

External links

Granite companies
Quarries in the United States